Lieutenant-General Muhammad Masood Aslam, HI, HI(M), SJ, afwc, psc, (born September 1, 1952, at Jhelum) is a retired three-star rank general officer who served almost 40 years in the Pakistan Army.

He was the principal commander of the XI Corps and he commanded the unified chain of command fighting the pro-Tehrik-e-Taliban forces in the North-West Pakistan from 2007 to 2010, specifically servicing as the Colonel Commandant of Punjab Regiment from 2008 to 2010. Masood directed and oversaw the major operations against the militants, including First Battle of Swat, operations Zalzala, Sherdil, Rah-e-Rast and the Rah-e-Nijat. />

Initial education
Lt Gen Masood Aslam was born in Mujahidabad, Jhelum in the northern Punjab. He got his early education from Presentation Convent High School, Jhelum and Government High School, Jhelum. By the year 1965, he joined Cadet College Hasan Abdal and did his intermediate in pre engineering in 1970 with honours from the same college. However, instead of pursuing career in engineering, he decided to serve as an Army officer and joined the Pakistan Military Academy in 1970.

Personal life
On 4 December 2009 Hashim Masood Aslam, a student of the College of Electrical and Mechanical Engineering in Rawalpindi and the only son of Lt. Gen. Masood Aslam, was a victim of the 2009 Parade Lane Mosque terrorist attack during Friday prayer.

Army career

Indo-Pakistani War of 1971
He was commissioned in the 4th Battalion of the Punjab Regiment (known as Beasi) on 14 November 1971 in the 47th PMA Long Course as his course was shortened due to East Pakistan crisis of 1971. Within a few weeks of commissioning, he was seriously wounded fighting in the front lines at Chumb-Jaurian sector. He was awarded Imtiazi Sanad (mentioned in despatches) and the 'Golden wound stripe' for his efforts and gallantry.

Military training
He was among the pioneer officers who established the computer branch at the GHQ in early 1970s. He is a graduate of Command and Staff College, Quetta, armed forces war course (Afwc), and holds a master's degree in War Studies from the National Defence College, Qaid e Azam University Islamabad. He has also attended overseas courses including United Nations peacekeeping course from Sweden and a Security Studies course from Asia-Pacific Center for Security Studies, Honolulu, Hawaii.

1987-2003 Siachen Conflict
He served at Siachen for more than a year in the early days of Siachen conflict with India. He established military posts at Siachen and served at glaciated heights of around 20,000 feet. As a Lt. Col, he commanded an Infantry battalion at Okara and then as a Brigadier-General, commanded two infantry brigades, one of which was at Minimarg in Gilgit Baltistan.

1999 Kargil War (Indo-Pakistani War)
He was awarded Sitara-i-Jurat for his extraordinary service and bravery by the then President Rafiq Tarar, after the Kargil encounter.

2001-02 military standoff and staff assignments
He commanded 23rd Infantry Division Jhelum on the LoC during the period of escalation, when Indian and Pakistani troops were tied up face to face in a very tense warlike state for two full years in 2001–03. He then served as the Director General NAB (Punjab), and was promoted to the rank of Lieutenant General in 2005 and posted as Inspector General Training and Evaluation (IGT&E).

Commander Peshawar Corps

2007 Taliban Waziristan Offensive
Lt Gen Masood Aslam took charge of the sensitive post of Corps Commander Peshawar, also known as XI Corps, replacing Lt Gen Muhammad Hamid Khan. This was period when Pakistan Army launched military operation against the vigilantes of Lal Masjid in Islamabad that followed with a rising trend of terrorist attacks throughout Pakistan, mostly emanating from the rugged lands of Waziristan and the surrounding tribal regions. A counter-terrorist operation was then launched under the general.

Swat, Buner, Dir Lower
Lt Gen Masood Aslam pushed out defeated the militants in Swat, Buner, Dir Lower and other districts of Malakand Division and inflicting heavy blows against the TTP cadres in Bajaur, Mohmand and Khyber tribal agencies and Frontier Region (FR) Bannu. Lt General Masood Aslam was given an extension in his tenure as he was supposed to retire in October 2009.

2007 First Battle of Swat
In the First Battle of Swat, also known as Operation Rah-e-Haq, Masood led the fight between Pakistan and the Taliban over control of the Swat District of Pakistan.

2008-09 Battle of Bajaur
In the Battle of Bajaur, also known as Operation Sherdil, Masood led this military offensive in the Bajaur region of Pakistan launched by the Frontier Corps and supported by a Combat Brigade of the Pakistan Army in which the Bajaur area had been under Taliban control since early 2007, and was said to be Al-Qaeda's main command and control hub for operations in Northeast Afghanistan, including Kunar province.

2008 Operation Zalzala
In Operation Zalzala, also known as Operation Earthquake, Masood commanded the first major Pakistan Army military offensive and counter-insurgent operation in South Waziristan which was commenced on January 18, 2008.

2009 Operation Black Thunderstorm
In Operation Black Thunderstorm, Lt. Gen Masood Aslam led a military operation conducted by the Pakistan Army, with the aim of retaking Buner, Lower Dir, Swat and Shangla districts from the Tehrik-i-Taliban Pakistan after the militants took control of them since the start of the year.

2009 Rah-e-Rast
Also known as The Second Battle of Swat, Lt. Gen Masood Aslam led Operation Rah-e-Rast and involved the Pakistani Army and Taliban militants in a fight for control of the Swat district of Pakistan.

2009 Mohmand Offensive
In the Mohmand Offensive, also known as Operation Brekhna/Thunder, Lt. Gen Masood Aslam led a Pakistani military operation against the Tehrik-i-Taliban in the Mohmand Agency area of the Federally Administered Tribal Areas.

2009 Operation Rah-e-Nijat
In Operation Rah-e-Nijat, also known as Path to Salvation, Lt. Gen Masood Aslam led a strategic offensive military operation by the unified command of Pakistan Armed Forces against the Tehrik-i-Taliban/TTP and their allies in the South Waziristan area of the Federally Administered Tribal Areas that began on June 19.)

Other honors
Elected President of the Frontier Golf Association (FGA) in 2008.

Post-retirement
Lieutenant General Muhammad Masood Aslam was awarded Hilal-i-Imtiaz in 2010. He was later posted as Pakistan Ambassador to Mexico in June 2011 for a three-year tenure.

Awards and decorations

References

1952 births
Cadet College Hasan Abdal alumni
Living people
Pakistani generals
Recipients of Hilal-i-Imtiaz
People from Jhelum District
University of Engineering and Technology, Lahore alumni
People of the insurgency in Khyber Pakhtunkhwa
Punjab Regiment officers
Ambassadors of Pakistan to Mexico